Alphonsa is a 1952 Indian Malayalam-language film, directed by O. J. Thottan and produced by N. X. George. The film stars Jose Prakash and Miss Kumari. The film had musical score by T. R. Pappa.

Cast
 Jose Prakash
 Miss Kumari
 E. C. Jacob
 Surendranath R.
 Rose
 Kamalakshi
 T. M. Abraham
 Ansalees
 C. R. Lakshmi
 P. K. Mohan

Songs
"Aadithya Prabha"
"Allalamallinte"
"Alphonse Alphonse"
"Bhaava Jeevikalkkaaswaasa" - Nagayya
"Kaniyoo Dayaanidhe"
"Kelkuka Ha" - Jose Prakash
"Maanasaveena" - P. Leela, Mothi
"Nanma Niranjoramme"
Prema Jeevitha Malarvaadi"
"Thaaramaarum Aarum Chernna" - Janamma David
"Varumo Varumo" - A. P. Komala, Mothi

References

External links
 

1952 films
1950s Malayalam-language films
Films scored by T. R. Pappa